The Grand Council of the Crees (Eeyou Istchee) or the GCC(EI) (ᐄᔨᔨᐤ ᐊᔅᒌ in Cree), is the political body that represents the approximately 18,000 Cree people (who call themselves "Eeyou" or "Eenou" in the various dialects of East Cree) of the territory called Eeyou Istchee ("The People's Land") in the James Bay and Nunavik regions of Northern Quebec, in The Grand Council has twenty members: a Grand Chief and Deputy-Grand Chief elected at large by the Cree people, the Chiefs elected by each of the ten communities, and one other representative from each community.

The newly elected Grand Chief Mandy Gull-Masty was elected on July 29, 2021. The newly elected Deputy Grand Chief is Norman A. Wapachee. The Grand Council's head office is located in the Cree community of Nemaska, with other offices and embassies in Montreal, Ottawa and Quebec City.

History
The Grand Council was formed in 1974 in response to the James Bay Cree hydroelectric conflict, which had already been underway since 1971. When the James Bay Project was first announced, Eeyou Istchee was still governed by a traditional political structure. That political structure was organized to exploit the resources of Eeyou Istchee by their traditional way of life. The land of Eeyou Istchee was divided into smaller territories, each headed by a leader or "ucimâu", that were resource management units and a means of distributing the Eeyou people over a vast territory. So the Crees organized themselves at a council of Cree leaders to represent their rights at the negotiations between the Cree Nation and the Quebec and Canadian governments, which led to the signing of the James Bay and Northern Quebec Agreement in November 1975.

On July 24, 2012, the Quebec government signed an accord with the Eeyou Nation that would result in the abolition of the municipality of Baie-James and the creation of a new regional government, the Eeyou Istchee James Bay Regional Government.

Cree Nation Government
The Cree Nation Government (Gouvernement de la nation crie, ᐄᓅᑎᐯᔨᐦᒋᒉᓲ, ᐄᔨᔫᑎᐯᔨᐦᒋᒉᓲ) formed in 1978 under the name  (CRA) and serves as the administrative authority of the Cree Nation of Eeyou Istchee and provides programs and services to its communities. The CRA is responsible for environmental protection and is also the legal body representing the nation to provincial and federal administrations.

While the CNG is a separate legal entity from the Grand Council of the Crees (Eeyou Istchee), they have identical membership, board of directors, governing structures and are de facto managed and operated as one organization by the Cree Nation.

An accord signed between the Cree Nation and the Quebec government on July 24, 2012, called for the status and name of the Cree Regional Authority to be changed to the Cree Nation Government. The Cree Nation Government currently has 309 employees.

Eeyou Eenou Police Force 
Founded in 2011, the Eeyou Eenou Police Force (EEPF) operates under the administration of the Cree Nation Government and covers the entirety of the Eeyou Istchee territory. It has regional detachments in nine of the Cree Communities in Quebec with the headquarters being in Chisasibi.

Political developments
The Grand Council of the Crees has been active in asserting the right of the Cree Nation to determine their own future, in the event that Quebec secedes from Canada. In October 1995, the Grand Council issued a "Message regarding the rights of the Crees and other Aboriginal Peoples of Canada", which stated, in part:

A few days prior to the October 30, 1995, province-wide referendum on secession from Canada, the Grand Council facilitated a referendum within Eeyou Istchee on the question of whether the Crees should be authorized to separate from an independent Quebec, in order to remain part of Canada. Over 96% of participating voters chose to remain in Canada.

Grand Chief Matthew Mukash is considered a traditionalist and fought against the Great Whale hydroelectric project in the 1990s, alongside the Grand Chiefs Matthew Coon Come and Billy Diamond. In 2002, he opposed the signing of the Agreement Respecting a New Relationship Between the Cree Nation and the Government of Quebec (Paix des Braves), a comprehensive 50 year political and economic agreement with the Government of Quebec, and as well as the 2002 and 2004 agreements with Hydro-Québec on the joint development of the hydroelectric resources of the Rupert River.

Elected in late 2005 as Grand Chief, in replacement of Ted Moses, Matthew Mukash is opposed to the Rupert River Diversion which is undergoing joint Quebec-Cree environmental assessment since 2004. Mukash has advocated with the Government of Quebec and Hydro-Québec to pursue wind power as an alternative source of economic development and energy. His other main political goals are to prepare a constitution, build sovereignty, encourage nation-building, and move Cree leadership back to Eeyou Istchee from Montreal and Ottawa.

Grand Chiefs
Mandy Gull-Masty, 2021-present
Abel Bosum, 2017–2021
Matthew Coon Come, 1987 to 1999 and 2009 to 2017
Matthew Mukas, 2005 to 2009
Ted Moses, 1984 to 1987 and 1999 to 2005
Billy Diamond, 1974 to 1984

Eeyou communities of the Grand Council
Chisasibi
Eastmain
Mistissini
Nemaska – seat of the GCCEI and CNG (CRA)
Oujé-Bougoumou
Waskaganish
Waswanipi
Wemindji
Whapmagoostui
Washaw Sibi Eeyou

References

 July 2007 population figures were obtained from the Cree Board of Health and Social Services of James Bay

Further reading

 Cree Board of Health and Social Services of James Bay, and Statistics Canada. Eeyou Istchee Aboriginal Peoples Survey 2001 A Report Prepared by the Cree Board of Health and Social Services of James Bay from Responses Given by 906 Eeyouch to Statistics Canada in the Spring of 2001. Chisasibi, Québec: Cree Board of Health and Social Services of James Bay, 2004. 
 Dewailly E., C. Blanchet, S. Gingras, S. Lemieux, and B. J. Holub. 2002. "Cardiovascular Disease Risk Factors and N-3 Fatty Acid Status in the Adult Population of James Bay Cree". The American Journal of Clinical Nutrition. 76, no. 1: 85–92.
 Gnarowski, Michael. I Dream of Yesterday and Tomorrow A Celebration of the James Bay Crees. Kemptville, Ont: Golden Dog Press, 2002. 
 Minde R., and K Minde. 1995. "Socio-Cultural Determinants of Psychiatric Symptomatology in James Bay Cree Children and Adolescents". Canadian Journal of Psychiatry. Revue Canadienne De Psychiatrie. 40, no. 6: 304–312.
 Morantz, Toby Elaine. An ethnohistoric study of eastern James Bay Cree social organization, 1700–1850. Ottawa: National Museums of Canada, 1983.
 Niezen, Ronald. Defending the Land Sovereignty and Forest Life in James Bay Cree Society. Cultural Survival studies in ethnicity and change. Boston: Allyn and Bacon, 1998. 
 Richardson, Boyce. Strangers Devour the Land A Chronicle of the Assault Upon the Last Coherent Hunting Culture in North America, the Cree Indians of Northern Quebec, and Their Vast Primeval Homelands. New York: Knopf :distributed by Random House, 1976. 
 Salisbury, Richard Frank. A Homeland for the Cree Regional Development in James Bay, 1971–1981. Kingston: McGill-Queen's University Press, 1986. 
 Scott, Simeon, and C. D. Ellis. Âtalôhkâna Nêsta Tipâcimôwina = Cree Legends and Narratives : from the West Coast of James Bay. Publications of the Algonquian Text Society. Winnipeg: University of Manitoba Press, 1995. 
 Siy, Alexandra. The Eeyou People of Eastern James Bay. New York: Dillon Press, 1993. 
 Willows N. D., J. Morel, and K. Gray-Donald. 2000. "Prevalence of Anemia Among James Bay Cree Infants of Northern Quebec". CMAJ : Canadian Medical Association Journal = Journal De L'Association Medicale Canadienne. 162, no. 3: 323–326.

External links
Grand Council of the Crees official website
News video showing their current conditions and prosperity
La Paix des Braves (Agreement concerning a new relationship between the Government of Quebec and the Crees of Quebec)
Agreement with Hydro-Québec (2004)
Canadian Geographic

First Nations governments in Quebec
Cree governments
Eeyou Istchee (territory)
Legislatures